Johannes Brinkies (born 20 June 1993) is a German footballer who plays for FSV Zwickau.

Club career

Hansa Rostock
A product of Hansa Rostock's youth academy, Brinkies made his league debut for the senior squad on 25 September 2012 in a 2–0 away victory over Stuttgart II.

Zwickau
In July 2016, Brinkies moved to 3. Liga club FSV Zwickau. He made his league debut for the club on 30 July 2016 in a 2–2 away draw with Mainz II. In September 2018, Brinkies suffered an inner ligament tear in his left knee, leaving him sidelined for six weeks, during a 1–1 draw in the league against Kaiserslautern.

References

External links

1993 births
Living people
People from Grevesmühlen
Footballers from Mecklenburg-Western Pomerania
German footballers
Germany youth international footballers
FC Hansa Rostock players
FSV Zwickau players
3. Liga players
Association football goalkeepers
21st-century German people